is a male Japanese judoka.

References

External links
 

1984 births
Living people
Japanese male judoka
Universiade medalists in judo
Universiade bronze medalists for Japan
Medalists at the 2009 Summer Universiade
20th-century Japanese people
21st-century Japanese people